Elections to Blackburn with Darwen Borough Council were held in 2007 on 3 May – the same day as other local elections in the UK.

Election result

|-
!colspan=2|Parties
!Seats
!Previous
!NetGain/Loss
|-
| 
|31||32||-1
|-
| 
|17||15||+2
|-
| 
|13||13||0
|-
|
|align=left|For Darwen
|3||1||+2
|-
| 
|0||0||0
|-
|
|align=left|Independent
|0||1||-1
|-
|
|align=left|Vacant
|0||2||-2
|-
|
!colspan=2|Total!!64!!64
|}

Wards

Corporation Park
One councillor to be elected.

Meadowhead
Two councillors to be elected.

References
 Election results – Blackburn with Darwen Council

2007 English local elections
2007
2000s in Lancashire